Agenda is a Swedish current events television program broadcast on Sveriges Television. The program debuted in 2001, hosted by Lars Adaktusson. A commentary, a summary of the news week, and a look at upcoming events were initially recurring segments but were later removed. The program has changed timeslots several times but is currently airing Sundays at 21.15 on SVT 2.

Hosts 
 2001–2005 – Lars Adaktusson
 2001–2008 – Karin Hübinette
 2008–2010 – Karin Hübinette and Anna Hedenmo
 2010–2011 – Anna Hedenmo and Marianne Rundström
 2011 – Anna Hedenmo and Camilla Kvartoft
 2012–present – Mats Knutson

Awards 
The program has been nominated for the television award Kristallen three times:
 2006 – Årets nyhetsprogram ("News show of the year")
 2009 – Årets nyhets- och debattprogram ("News- and debate program of the year")
 2010 – Årets fakta- och aktualitetsprogram ("Fact- and current events program of the year")

References

External links 
Official web page

2001 Swedish television series debuts
2000s Swedish television series
2010s Swedish television series
Swedish television talk shows
Current affairs shows